Annihilator is a 1986 science fiction television film directed by Michael Chapman and starring Mark Lindsay Chapman, Catherine Mary Stewart, Susan Blakely and Lisa Blount. It was an unsold pilot for a potential TV series.

Premise
A newspaper reporter, Robert Armour, is in a romantic relationship with another reporter, Angela. Angela, along with her friend, Cindy (a photographer for the paper) take a flight to Hawaii. When Angela and Cindy return from the vacation, they act strangely, causing Robert to be concerned, and the women turn out to be androids who try to kill Robert. An alien force planning on taking over the world caused Flight 508 to disappear; they abducted the human passengers and replaced them with identical-looking androids. Robert now becomes the hunter and hunted, knowing he must hunt down the androids.

Cast
 Mark Lindsay Chapman as Robert Armour
 Susan Blakely as Layla
 Lisa Blount as Cindy
 Brion James as Alien Leader
 Earl Boen as Sid
 Geoffrey Lewis as Prof. Alan Jeffries
 Catherine Mary Stewart as Angela Taylor
 Nicole Eggert as Elyse Jeffries
 Paul Brinegar as Pops
 Barry Pearl as Eddie 
 Barbara Townsend as Celia Evans
 Channing Chase as Susan Weiss
 Glen Vernon as Henry Evans
 Richard Partlow as FBI Agent #2
 Biff Yeager as FBI Agent #1

Awards
1986: Primetime Emmy Award - Nomination in the Outstanding Achievement in Makeup for a Miniseries or a Special category for Michael Westmore and Zoltan Elek

External links
 

1986 television films
1986 films
American science fiction television films
NBC network original films
Films scored by Sylvester Levay
Films directed by Michael Chapman
Television pilots not picked up as a series
1980s English-language films
1980s American films